Tomáš Bezdeda (born December 2, 1985, in Žilina, Slovakia) is a Slovak singer who rose to popularity after placing third in Slovensko Hľadá SuperStar, the Slovak version of Pop Idol, shown by STV. He worked as a moderator of the music program XXL in STV. In 2006, Bezdeda took part in 'Let's Dance' on TV Markíza.

In 2009, Bezdeda attempted to represent Slovakia at the Eurovision Song Contest and to be the first Slovak entry in the contest since 1998. Bezdeda performed at the Eurosong contest, and in the final came second in the televoting with the song "Každý z nás", beaten by Kamil Mikulčík and Nela Pocisková. In 2010 he will once again try to win the Eurosong contest, this time performing the song "Na strechách domov".

Discography
Albums
Slovensko hľadá Superstar Top 11 (April 2005)
Obyčajné slová (August 2005)
Ostrov (November 2006)
Bronzový(2013)

Singles
Únos

Slovensko hľadá SuperStar Performances
Semi Finals: "Malý princ" by AYA
Top 11: "Dnes" by Tublatanka
Top 10: "Tears in Heaven" by Eric Clapton
Top 9: "When You're in Love with a Beautiful Woman" by Dr Hook
Top 8: "Hľadám" by No Name
Top 7: "Reklama na ticho" by Team
Top 6: "Stumblin' In" by Chris Norman & Suzi Quatro
Top 6: "Ó Maňo" by Vidiek & Věra Bílá
Top 6: "V slepých uličkách" by Miro Žbirka & Marika Gombitová
Top 5: "She Loves You" by The Beatles
Top 5: "Always on My Mind" by Elvis Presley
Top 4: "Poďme sa zachrániť" by Peter Nagy
Top 4: "Voda, čo ma drží nad Vodou" by Elán
Top 3: "They Can't Take That Away from Me" by Fred Astaire
Top 3: "New York, New York" by Frank Sinatra
Top 3: "Blue Moon" by Billy Vaughn

See also
 The 100 Greatest Slovak Albums of All Time

References

External links
Official Site www.tomas-bezdeda.com
Official Fan Forum www.bezdedoland.sk

1985 births
Living people
Idols (franchise) participants
Bezdas
21st-century Slovak male singers